Partenope is a 1730 opera by George Frideric Handel.

Partenope may also refer to:

 Partenope (Vinci), a 1725 opera by Leonardo Vinci
 Partenope (Zumaya), a 1711 opera by Manuel de Zumaya
 Partenope Napoli Basket, an Italian amateur basketball team from Naples, Campania
 Partenope-class cruiser, a group of eight torpedo cruisers built for the Italian Regia Marina
 Italian cruiser Partenope, torpedo cruiser built for the Italian Regia Marina

See also 
 Parthenope (disambiguation)